Ingalls Park is a census-designated place and suburb of Joliet in Will County, Illinois, United States. The population was 3,314 at the 2010 census. The town consists of a small neighborhood and a few businesses between Joliet's Pilcher Park and Interstate 80. It is the nearest town to Chicagoland Speedway, which hosted the NASCAR Cup Series from 2001 to 2019.

Geography
Ingalls Park is located at  (41.520281, -88.037405).

Demographics

As of the census of 2000, there were 3,082 people, 1,244 households, and 808 families residing in the CDP. The racial makeup of the CDP was 89.62% White, 2.95% African American, 0.32% Native American, 0.29% Asian, 3.99% from other races, and 2.82% from two or more races. Hispanic or Latino of any race were 12.91% of the population.

There were 1,244 households, out of which 30.3% had children under the age of 18 living with them, 48.6% were married couples living together, 11.3% had a female householder with no husband present, and 35.0% were non-families. 28.7% of all households were made up of individuals, and 9.5% had someone living alone who was 65 years of age or older. The average household size was 2.48 and the average family size was 3.06.

In the CDP, the population was spread out, with 24.4% under the age of 18, 9.3% from 18 to 24, 33.9% from 25 to 44, 19.4% from 45 to 64, and 13.0% who were 65 years of age or older. The median age was 34 years. For every 100 females, there were 101.7 males. For every 100 females age 18 and over, there were 99.1 males.

The median income for a household in the CDP was $44,076, and the median income for a family was $48,750. Males had a median income of $41,507 versus $24,868 for females. The per capita income for the CDP was $18,628. About 3.9% of families and 5.1% of the population were below the poverty line, including 3.3% of those under age 18 and 9.3% of those age 65 or over.

References

Census-designated places in Will County, Illinois
Census-designated places in Illinois